Louis Christopher Pendleton (October 13, 1931 – January 14, 2007) was an African-American dentist, businessman, and civil rights leader in Shreveport, Louisiana. He played a leading role in establishing "Blacks United for Lasting Leadership" ("BULL"), a group seeking racial justice in the city.

Pendleton is credited with taking steps to enact changes to the city charter that made it possible for Shreveport to have black city council members and ultimately a black mayor.

Pendleton died in Shreveport at the age of 75.

References

1931 births
2007 deaths
African-American people in Louisiana politics
Louisiana Democrats
African-American dentists
American dentists
People from Monroe, Louisiana
People from Shreveport, Louisiana
Dillard University alumni
Meharry Medical College alumni
Activists for African-American civil rights
United States Air Force officers
African-American businesspeople
20th-century American businesspeople
African-American scientists
American scientists
20th-century dentists
20th-century African-American people
21st-century African-American people